In mathematics, the Heisenberg group , named after Werner Heisenberg, is the group of 3×3 upper triangular matrices of the form

under the operation of matrix multiplication. Elements a, b and c can be taken from any commutative ring with identity, often taken to be the ring of real numbers (resulting in the "continuous Heisenberg group") or the ring of integers (resulting in the "discrete Heisenberg group").

The continuous Heisenberg group arises in the description of one-dimensional quantum mechanical systems, especially in the context of the Stone–von Neumann theorem. More generally, one can consider Heisenberg groups associated to n-dimensional systems, and most generally, to any symplectic vector space.

The three-dimensional case
In the three-dimensional case, the product of two Heisenberg matrices is given by:

As one can see from the term {{math|ab}}, the group is non-abelian.

The neutral element of the Heisenberg group is the identity matrix, and inverses are given by

The group is a subgroup of the 2-dimensional affine group Aff(2):   acting on  corresponds to the affine transform .

There are several prominent examples of the three-dimensional case.

Continuous Heisenberg group
If , are real numbers (in the ring R) then one has the continuous Heisenberg group H3(R).

It is a nilpotent real Lie group of dimension 3.

In addition to the representation as real 3×3 matrices, the continuous Heisenberg group also has several different representations in terms of function spaces. By Stone–von Neumann theorem, there is, up to isomorphism, a unique irreducible unitary representation of H in which its centre acts by a given nontrivial character. This representation has several important realizations, or models. In the Schrödinger model, the Heisenberg group acts on the space of square integrable functions. In the theta representation, it acts on the space of holomorphic functions on the upper half-plane; it is so named for its connection with the theta functions.

Discrete Heisenberg group

If ,  are integers (in the ring Z) then one has the discrete Heisenberg group H3(Z). It is a non-abelian nilpotent group. It has two generators,

and relations

,

where

is the generator of the center of H3. (Note that the inverses of x, y, and z replace the 1 above the diagonal with −1.)

By Bass's theorem, it has a polynomial growth rate of order 4.

One can generate any element through

 Heisenberg group modulo an odd prime p 
If one takes a, b, c in Z/p Z for an odd prime p, then one has the Heisenberg group modulo p. It is a group of order p3 with generators x,y and relations:

Analogues of Heisenberg groups over finite fields of odd prime order p are called extra special groups, or more properly, extra special groups of exponent p.  More generally, if the derived subgroup of a group G is contained in the center Z of  G, then the map from G/Z × G/Z → Z is a skew-symmetric bilinear operator on abelian groups.

However, requiring that G/Z to be a finite vector space requires the Frattini subgroup of G to be contained in the center, and requiring that Z be a one-dimensional vector space over Z/p Z requires that Z have order p, so if G is not abelian, then G is extra special.  If G is extra special but does not have exponent p, then the general construction below applied to the symplectic vector space G/Z does not yield a group isomorphic to G.

Heisenberg group modulo 2
The Heisenberg group modulo 2 is of order 8 and is isomorphic to the dihedral group D4 (the symmetries of a square). Observe that if

.

Then

and

The elements x and y correspond to reflections (with 45° between them), whereas xy and yx correspond to rotations by 90°. The other reflections are xyx and yxy, and rotation by 180° is xyxy (=yxyx).

 Heisenberg algebra
The Lie algebra  of the Heisenberg group  (over the real numbers) is known as the Heisenberg algebra.  
It may be represented using the space of 3×3 matrices of the form

These basis elements satisfy the commutation relations,
.

The name "Heisenberg group" is motivated by the preceding relations, which have the same form as the canonical commutation relations in quantum mechanics,

The Heisenberg group    has the special property that the exponential map is a one-to-one and onto map from the Lie algebra  to the group ,

 In conformal field theory 
In conformal field theory, the term Heisenberg algebra is used to refer to an infinite-dimensional generalization of the above algebra. It is spanned by elements , with commutation relations

Under a rescaling, this is simply a countably-infinite number of copies of the above algebra.

Higher dimensions
More general Heisenberg groups  may be defined for higher dimensions in Euclidean space, and more generally on symplectic vector spaces. The simplest general case is the real Heisenberg group of dimension , for any integer .

where
 a is a row vector of length n,
 b is a column vector of length n,
 In is the identity matrix of size n.

Group structure
This is indeed a group, as is shown by the multiplication:

and

Lie algebra
The Heisenberg group is a simply-connected Lie group whose Lie algebra consists of matrices

where

 a is a row vector of length n, 
 b is a column vector of length n,
 0n is the zero matrix of size n.

By letting e1, ..., en be the canonical basis of Rn, and setting

the associated Lie algebra can be characterized by the canonical commutation relations,

where p1, ..., pn, q1, ..., qn, z are the algebra generators.

In particular, z is a central element of the Heisenberg Lie algebra. Note that the Lie algebra of the Heisenberg group is nilpotent.

Exponential map
Let 

which fulfills . The exponential map evaluates to

The exponential map of any nilpotent Lie algebra is a diffeomorphism between the Lie algebra and the unique associated connected, simply-connected Lie group.

This discussion (aside from statements referring to dimension and Lie group) further applies if we replace R by any commutative ring A. The corresponding group is denoted Hn(A ).

Under the additional assumption that the prime 2 is invertible in the ring A, the exponential map is also defined, since it reduces to a finite sum and has the form above (e.g. A could be a ring Z/p Z with an odd prime p or any field of characteristic 0).

 Representation theory 

The unitary representation theory of the Heisenberg group is fairly simple – later generalized by Mackey theory – and was the motivation for its introduction in quantum physics, as discussed below.

For each nonzero real number , we can define an irreducible unitary representation  of  acting on the Hilbert space  by the formula:

This representation is known as the Schrödinger representation. The motivation for this representation is the action of the exponentiated position and momentum operators in quantum mechanics. The parameter  describes translations in position space, the parameter  describes translations in momentum space, and the parameter  gives an overall phase factor. The phase factor is needed to obtain a group of operators, since translations in position space and translations in momentum space do not commute.

Alternatively, that they are all equivalent to the Weyl algebra (or CCR algebra) on a symplectic space of dimension 2n.

Conceptually, the representation given above constitutes the quantum mechanical counterpart to the group of translational symmetries on the classical phase space, . The Hamiltonian generators of translations in phase space are the position and momentum functions. The span of these functions do not form a Lie algebra under the Poisson bracket however, because  Rather, the span of the position and momentum functions and the constants forms a Lie algebra under the Poisson bracket. This Lie algebra is a one-dimensional central extension of the commutative Lie algebra , isomorphic to the Lie algebra of the Heisenberg group.

On symplectic vector spaces
The general abstraction of a Heisenberg group is constructed from any symplectic vector space.  For example, let (V, ω) be a finite-dimensional real symplectic vector space (so ω is a nondegenerate skew symmetric bilinear form on V).  The Heisenberg group H(V) on (V, ω) (or simply V for brevity) is the set V×R endowed with the group law

The Heisenberg group is a central extension of the additive group V.  Thus there is an exact sequence

Any symplectic vector space admits a Darboux basis {ej, fk}1 ≤ j,k ≤ n satisfying ω(ej, fk) = δjk and where 2n is the dimension of V (the dimension of V is necessarily even).  In terms of this basis, every vector decomposes as

The qa and pa are canonically conjugate coordinates.

If {ej, fk}1 ≤ j,k ≤ n is a Darboux basis for V, then let {E} be a basis for R, and {ej, fk, E}1 ≤ j,k ≤ n is the corresponding basis for V×R.  A vector in H(V) is then given by

and the group law becomes

Because the underlying manifold of the Heisenberg group is a linear space, vectors in the Lie algebra can be canonically identified with vectors in the group.  The Lie algebra of the Heisenberg group is given by the commutation relation

or written in terms of the Darboux basis

and all other commutators vanish.

It is also possible to define the group law in a different way but which yields a group isomorphic to the group we have just defined. To avoid confusion, we will use u instead of t, so a vector is given by

and the group law is

An element of the group 
 
can then be expressed as a matrix
 ,
which gives a faithful matrix representation of H(V).

 ,
as before.

The isomorphism to the group using upper triangular matrices relies on the decomposition of V into a Darboux basis, which amounts to a choice of isomorphism V ≅ U ⊕ U*. Although the new group law yields a group isomorphic to the one given higher up, the group with this law is sometimes referred to as the polarized Heisenberg group as a reminder that this group law relies on a choice of basis (a choice of a Lagrangian subspace of V is a polarization).

To any Lie algebra, there is a unique connected, simply connected Lie group G.  All other connected Lie groups with the same Lie algebra as G are of the form G/N where N is a central discrete group in G.  In this case, the center of H(V) is R and the only discrete subgroups are isomorphic to Z.  Thus H(V)/Z is another Lie group which shares this Lie algebra.  Of note about this Lie group is that it admits no faithful finite-dimensional representations; it is not isomorphic to any matrix group.  It does however have a well-known family of infinite-dimensional unitary representations.

The connection with the Weyl algebra

The Lie algebra  of the Heisenberg group was described above, (1), as a Lie algebra of matrices. The Poincaré–Birkhoff–Witt theorem applies to determine the universal enveloping algebra . Among other properties, the universal enveloping algebra is an associative algebra into which  injectively imbeds.

By the Poincaré–Birkhoff–Witt theorem, it is thus the free vector space generated by the monomials

where the exponents are all non-negative.

Consequently,  consists of real polynomials 

with the commutation relations

The algebra  is closely related to the algebra of differential operators on ℝn with polynomial coefficients, since any such operator has a unique representation in the form

This algebra is called the Weyl algebra. However, this is also easy to see directly from the above representations; viz. by the mapping

 Applications 

 Weyl's parameterization of quantum mechanics 

The application that led Hermann Weyl to an explicit realization of the Heisenberg group was the question of why the Schrödinger picture and Heisenberg picture are physically equivalent. Abstractly, the reason is the Stone–von Neumann theorem: there is a unique unitary representation with given action of the central Lie algebra element z,  up to a unitary equivalence: the nontrivial elements of the algebra are all equivalent to the usual position and momentum operators.

Thus, the Schrödinger picture and Heisenberg picture are equivalent – they are just different ways of realizing this essentially unique representation.

 Theta representation 

The same uniqueness result was used by David Mumford for discrete Heisenberg groups, in his theory of equations defining abelian varieties. This is a large generalization of the approach used in Jacobi's elliptic functions, which is the case of the modulo 2 Heisenberg group, of order 8. The simplest case is the theta representation of the Heisenberg group, of which the discrete case gives the theta function.

 Fourier analysis 
The Heisenberg group also occurs in Fourier analysis, where it is used in some formulations of the Stone–von Neumann theorem. In this case, the Heisenberg group can be understood to act on the space of square integrable functions; the result is a representation of the Heisenberg groups sometimes called the Weyl representation.

As a sub-Riemannian manifold

The three-dimensional Heisenberg group H3(R) on the reals can also be understood to be a smooth manifold, and specifically, a simple example of a sub-Riemannian manifold. Given a point p=(x,y,z) in R3, define a differential 1-form Θ at this point as

This one-form belongs to the cotangent bundle of R3; that is,

is a map on the tangent bundle.  Let

It can be seen that H is a subbundle of the tangent bundle TR3. A cometric on H is given by projecting vectors to the two-dimensional space spanned by vectors in the x and y direction.

The resulting structure turns H into the manifold of the Heisenberg group. An orthonormal frame on the manifold is given by the Lie vector fields

which obey the relations [X, Y] = Z and [X, Z] = [Y, Z] = 0. Being Lie vector fields, these form a left-invariant basis for the group action.  The geodesics on the manifold are spirals, projecting down to circles in two dimensions. That is, if

is a geodesic curve, then the curve  is an arc of a circle, and

with the integral limited to the two-dimensional plane. That is, the height of the curve is proportional to the area of the circle subtended by the circular arc, which follows by Stokes' theorem.

Heisenberg group of a locally compact abelian group
It is more generally possible to define the Heisenberg group of a locally compact abelian group K, equipped with a Haar measure. Such a group has a Pontrjagin dual , consisting of all continuous -valued characters on K, which is also a locally compact abelian group if endowed with the compact-open topology.

In more detail, the Hilbert space  consists of square-integrable complex-valued functions  on K.  The translations in K form a unitary representation of K as operators on :

So too do the multiplications by characters:

These operators do not commute, and instead satisfy

multiplication by a fixed unit modulus complex number.

More general Heisenberg groups are described by 2-cocyles in the cohomology group .

Indeed, the continuous characters separate points so any unitary operator of  that commutes with them is an  multiplier. But commuting with translations implies that the multiplier is constant.

A version of the Stone–von Neumann theorem, proved by George Mackey, holds for the Heisenberg group . See the discussion at Stone–von Neumann theorem#Relation to the Fourier transform for details.

See also
 Canonical commutation relations
 Wigner–Weyl transform
 Stone–von Neumann theorem
 Projective representation

Notes

References

External links 

 Groupprops, The Group Properties Wiki  Unitriangular matrix group UT(3,p)

Group theory
Lie groups
Mathematical quantization
Mathematical physics
Werner Heisenberg